William Francis Joseph Lautour (21 August 1812 – 11 November 1899) was an English first-class cricketer. Lautour was a left-handed batsman.

Lautour made his first-class debut for the left-handed cricket team against the Marylebone Cricket Club in 1838. In between making his debut for the Marylebone Cricket Club in 1845, he represented a number of teams in other first-class matches. Lautour represented the West, the Gentlemen in the 1844 Gentlemen v Players match as well as playing a single first-class match for an early England side against Kent.

In 1845, he made his debut for the Marylebone Cricket Club against Hampshire. Overall he represented the club in 3 first-class matches up to 1847. During this period he also played a number of non first-class matches for Dorset.

In 1849, Lautour represented Hampshire in a single first-class match against an All-England Eleven. In the same year he played his final first-class match for Gentlemen of England against the Gentlemen of Kent.

Lautour died on 11 November 1899 at Hexton, Hertfordshire.

External links
William Lautour at Cricinfo
William Lautour at CricketArchive

1812 births
1899 deaths
People from Marylebone
Cricketers from Greater London
English cricketers
Gentlemen cricketers
Marylebone Cricket Club cricketers
Hampshire cricketers
English cricketers of 1826 to 1863
Left-Handed v Right-Handed cricketers
West of England cricketers
Non-international England cricketers
Gentlemen of England cricketers